Gigi Fernández and Natasha Zvereva defeated Larisa Neiland and Jana Novotná in the final, 6–3, 7–5 to win the doubles tennis title at the 1993 Virginia Slims Championships.

Arantxa Sánchez Vicario and Helena Suková were the defending champions, but were defeated in the semifinals by Neiland and Novotná.

Seeds

Draw

Finals

See also
WTA Tour Championships appearances

References 

Doubles
1993 WTA Tour